Brigadier General James Edward Wharton (December 2, 1894 – August 12, 1944) was a career United States Army officer who briefly commanded the 28th Infantry Division in the Battle of Normandy before being killed in action during World War II.

Early life and military career
Wharton was born in Elk, Chaves County, New Mexico on December 2, 1894. He grew up in New Mexico and Arizona, and graduated from the College of Agriculture and Mechanic Arts at New Mexico State University in 1917. He received his commission as a second lieutenant through the Reserve Officers' Training Corps (ROTC).

Wharton was commissioned in the Infantry Branch. His World War I and subsequent assignments included the 62nd and 57th Infantry Regiments in the Philippines, and he later served at Camp Fremont, Fort Benning, Fort Lee, and with the 3rd U.S. Infantry at Fort Snelling. Wharton also served as an instructor at the U.S. Army Command and General Staff College.

In addition to graduating from the U.S. Army Infantry School at Fort Benning, Wharton was a graduate of the Army Command and General Staff College, United States Army War College, and Army Industrial College.

World War II and death

He was Chief of the Officer Branch in the Personnel Division (G-1) of the War Department General Staff when the United States entered World War II.  In March, 1942, he was promoted to the temporary rank of brigadier general as Director of the Military Personnel Division  in the Army Services of Supply.

In 1943 he served as Assistant Division Commander (ADC) of the 80th Infantry Division during its creation and initial training.

Wharton commanded the 1st Engineer Special Brigade on Utah Beach as part of the D-Day landings in Normandy. Engineer Special Brigades were large organizations (15 to 20 thousand soldiers) which were responsible for transferring equipment and personnel off the beachheads and making them available for assault operations.

After the D-Day invasion he succeeded Brigadier General Donald A. Stroh as ADC of the 9th Infantry Division, then commanded by Major General Manton S. Eddy and serving in Normandy.

He remained in this post only briefly, however, as on August 12, Wharton succeeded Major General Lloyd D. Brown as Commanding General (CG) of the 28th Infantry Division. On the same day that Wharton took command, he was visiting his front line units in order to gain an understanding of their current situation. He was shot and killed by a German sniper while at the command post of the 112th Infantry Regiment near Sourdeval, Normandy, France. He was succeeded by Norman Cota.

Wharton was temporarily interred in France. He was later buried at Arlington National Cemetery, Section 34, Site 1198.

Awards
Army Distinguished Service Medal for his achievements with the 1st Engineer Special Brigade and the 80th and 9th Infantry Divisions.
Legion of Merit for superior service with the Services of Supply.
Purple Heart (posthumous).
World War I Victory Medal
American Defense Service Medal
American Campaign Medal
European-African-Middle Eastern Campaign Medal with one campaign star
World War II Victory Medal (posthumous)

Legacy
In 1952 the 112th Infantry Regiment was stationed in Heilbronn, Germany when the 28th Division was activated for the Korean War. The casern used as its headquarters was christened Wharton Barracks.  Wharton Barracks was closed in 1989.

Family
In 1921 Wharton married Madelyn Burke of Petersburg, Virginia (1893–1952).  Their children included sons Edward B. (1927–1991) and Robert H. (born 1929). Robert H. Wharton became a priest in 1954.

References

External links
Army Distinguished Service Medal, James E. Wharton at Military Times Hall of Valor
Arlington National Cemetery
Generals of World War II

1894 births
1944 deaths
United States Army Infantry Branch personnel
Military personnel from New Mexico
People from Chaves County, New Mexico
United States Army personnel of World War I
United States Army personnel killed in World War II
United States Army generals
New Mexico State University alumni
United States Army Command and General Staff College alumni
United States Army War College alumni
Dwight D. Eisenhower School for National Security and Resource Strategy alumni
Recipients of the Distinguished Service Medal (US Army)
Recipients of the Legion of Merit
Burials at Arlington National Cemetery
United States Army generals of World War II
Deaths by firearm in France